Restaurants Unlimited, Inc. (RUI) was an American food and beverage firm. Rich Komen founded the company in 1969, and it was headquartered in Seattle, Washington, United States. 

Brands included Skates on the Bay, Portland City Grill, Manzana Grill, Palisade, Cutters Crabhouse, Stanford's, Henry's Tavern, Kincaid's, Palomino Restaurant & Bar and Portland Seafood Company.

Restaurants Unlimited filed for Chapter 11 bankruptcy on July 7, 2019. At the time of filing, there were 35 locations owned by the firm across six states.

History
In 2007, Sun Capital Partners acquired Restaurants Unlimited for an unspecified amount.

In July 2015, Jim Eschweiler was named president and CEO.

In 2018, Unlimited began adding a 1% “Living Wage Fee” to their customer's bill.

On July 7, 2019 the firm filed for Chapter 11 bankruptcy protection.

In September 2019, Landry's, Inc. purchased the firm.

References

Further reading

External links
 Restaurants Unlimited Inc

Companies based in Seattle
Restaurant groups in the United States
2007 mergers and acquisitions
Companies that filed for Chapter 11 bankruptcy in 2019